Thomas "Tom" S. Hutchinson (born May 25, 1965) is an American politician, business owner, and triathlete. He is currently a member of the Maryland House of Delegates for District 37B.

Background
Hutchinson graduated from Dickinson College with a Bachelor of Science degree in computer science. He later received a Master of Business Administration degree from Loyola University Maryland. He and his family purchased a home in Woolford, Maryland, in 2003, where they stayed weekends before moving there permanently in 2010.

In January 2014, Hutchinson was elected to serve as the president of Cambridge Main Street. During his tenure, downtown Cambridge experienced a re-emergence of restaurants, retail, beautification, and tourism.

Also in 2014, Hutchinson collaborated with local officials and the World Triathlon Corporation to host a full distance Ironman Triathlon event in the county. He would participate in the triathlon in 2017, coming in 732nd place out of 1,522 participants.

Since 2020, Hutchinson has run his own home improvement company, Hutchinson Home Services LLC.

In March 2022, Hutchinson announced his candidacy for the Maryland House of Delegates in District 37B, seeking to succeed state delegate Johnny Mautz, who had announced a run for the Maryland Senate. He ran on a slate with incumbent state delegate Christopher T. Adams, and won the Republican primary on July 19 with 35.4 percent of the vote and as the top vote-getter in Talbot and Dorchester counties.

In the legislature 
Hutchinson was sworn into the Maryland House of Delegates on January 11, 2023. He is a member of the House Health and Government Operations Committee.

Personal life
Hutchinson has a daughter named Helen.

Electoral history

References

External links
 

21st-century American politicians
1965 births
Dickinson College alumni
Living people
Loyola University Maryland alumni
People from Dorchester County, Maryland
Businesspeople from Maryland
Republican Party members of the Maryland House of Delegates